ArtAsiaPacific is the longest running English-language periodical solely dedicated to covering contemporary art and culture from sixty-seven countries, territories, and Chinese Special Administrative Regions that it considers to be within Asia, the Pacific, and the Middle East. It is published six times a year and is distributed internationally. A regular issue includes feature-length articles on artists, themes or events; essays; profiles on artists or collectors; reviews of biennials, exhibitions, art publications and films; news including obituaries and appointments; auction and art fair reports; and previews of shows.

ArtAsiaPacific produces an annual almanac edition, published in January, which surveys the past year in the 67 countries and territories covered in the magazine. In addition to news, exhibition, festival and country reports, the almanac includes reports on five outstanding artists from the previous year and one promising artist for the next year, and essays written by prominent curators and cultural figures.

History

The magazine first launched as Art and Asia Pacific in March 1993 in Australia. Published quarterly, it began more as an academic journal than a standard consumer magazine and each issue would focus on a different country or theme. While the first issue was published by Janet Gough, it was then published and edited by Dynah Dysart/Fine Art Press Pty Limited, Sydney, until October 2003. There are two inaugural issues both bearing Volume 1 No 1. The first issue (52 pages) was dated March 1993, while the second issue (100 pages)also bearing Vol 1 No 1 and mention of it being the inaugural volume was issued in December 1993. It was then purchased by Gang Zhao and Wendy Siegelman and moved to New York.

In the fall of 2004, Elaine W. Ng took over as editor-in-chief, and eventually purchased and co-published the magazine along with author Simon Winchester in March 2005, effectively re-launching it under the slogan "Today's Art From Tomorrow's World." This marked a dramatic movement in the magazine's design and focus; the editorial content became more journalistic and reader-friendly. In 2006, the first almanac edition of the magazine was released with the goal of covering the past year in Asian art and culture along with profiles and informational listings of each of the 67 countries covered by the magazine.

As of January 2007, Elaine W. Ng is the sole publisher and editor-in-chief of the magazine. Formerly, produced in an office in the gallery district of  Manhattan's Chelsea neighborhood, the magazine moved production to Hong Kong in 2011.

List of notable contributors
A number of important figures within the contemporary art world have contributed to ArtAsiaPacific, including:
Takashi Murakami 
Alexandra Munroe 
Uli Sigg 
Ai Weiwei 
Hou Hanru 
Rirkrit Tiravanija 
Cai Guo-Qiang 
Christopher Doyle 
Ranjit Hoskote 
Jack Persekian 
Arto Lindsay 
Baiju Parthan 
Michael Shaowanasai 
Nancy Adajania 
Amanda McDonald Crowley 
Rhana Devenport 
Lee Yongwoo
Ahmed Mater

Notable cover appearances
Each issue of ArtAsiaPacific features work by a different artist, designer, or architect. Many of these featured artists have had their work appear on an ArtAsiaPacific cover long before they achieved wider international recognition, including:
Zhang Xiaogang – Chinese painter, creator of renowned "Bloodlines" series (Vol. 3 No. 1, 1996)
Atul Dodiya – Indian painter (No. 33)
Ai Weiwei – Chinese sculptor, performance artist, curator and architect; co-designer of the Beijing National Stadium (No. 40, Spring 2004)

References

External links
 

1993 establishments in Australia
Monthly magazines published in Australia
Asian art
Contemporary art magazines
Magazines established in 1993
Middle Eastern art
Oceanian art
Quarterly magazines published in Australia
Arts magazines published in Australia